This is a list of results for the Legislative Council at the 2015 New South Wales state election.

Results

Continuing members 

The following members of the Legislative Council were not up for re-election this year.

See also
 Results of the 2015 New South Wales state election (Legislative Assembly)
 Candidates of the 2015 New South Wales state election
 Members of the New South Wales Legislative Council, 2015–2019

Notes

References

2015 Legislative Council